The 1991 Masters (officially the 1991 Benson & Hedges Masters) was a professional non-ranking snooker tournament that took place between 3 and 10 February 1991 at the Wembley Conference Centre in London, England. The highest break of the tournament was a 135 compiled by Dennis Taylor, for which he earned £7,500.

In the final, defending champion Stephen Hendry performed what is considered to be one of the greatest comebacks in snooker history, when he defeated Mike Hallett 9–8, after trailing 0–7 and 2–8 earlier in the match.

World number 1 Hendry went into the final as a firm 1/6 favourite, and with 9–3 Hendry being the most favoured score with the bookies, but world number 7 Hallett played one of the most dominant snooker sessions by an underdog to win all 7 frames of the afternoon session to take a 7–0 lead. In the first frame of the evening session, Hallett missed the final pink that would have made it 8–0, with Hendry then potting the pink and black to win his first frame of the match. Hendry reduced his arrears to 2–7, but then Hallett made it 8–2 and just one frame from victory. With the Masters title in his sights, Hallett just needed to pot the final pink and black in the eleventh frame to win the match, but he narrowly missed the pink with the rest, allowing Hendry to pot the pink to win the frame and reduce his arrears to 3–8. Despite Hallett having numerous chances in the following six frames, including in the last frame where Hallett led until the last few balls, Hendry eventually made a historic recovery to win 9–8.

Places in the tournament were allocated to the top 16 players in the world rankings. World number one Stephen Hendry was the number 1 seed. Players seeded 15 and 16 (Tony Meo and Alain Robidoux) competed in the wild-card round against Alan McManus, who was the winner of the qualifying event, and Gary Wilkinson (ranked 19), who was the wild-card selection. Martin Clark (ranked 12), Alan McManus, Alain Robidoux, and Gary Wilkinson were making their Masters debuts.

Wild-card round

Main draw

Final

Qualifying Event
Alan McManus won the qualifying tournament, known as the 1990 Benson & Hedges Satellite Championship at the time beating James Wattana 9–5 in the final to qualify for the main tournament at Wembley. The tournament was played at the Masters Club in Glasgow between 1 and 6 December 1990.

Century breaks
Total: 9
 135  Dennis Taylor
 131, 117, 114  Stephen Hendry
 125  Mike Hallett
 107  Doug Mountjoy
 103, 101  Jimmy White
 101  Steve James

References 

Masters (snooker)
Masters
Masters (snooker)
Masters (snooker)
Masters (snooker)